Knockninny is a barony in County Fermanagh, Northern Ireland. To its east lies Upper Lough Erne, and it is bordered by four other baronies in Northern Ireland: Clanawley to the north-west; Tirkennedy to the north; Magherastephana to the north-east; and Coole to the east. It also borders two baronies in the Republic of Ireland: Loughtee Lower to the south; and Tullyhaw to the south-west.

History
Knockninny is believed to takes its name from St. Ninnidh, a 6th-century saint. St. Ninnid is listed as one of the "twelve apostles of Ireland", and bore the epithet of Saobhruisc meaning "squinting", given rise to the names; "the squinting saint" or "one-eyed saint". The hill of St. Ninnid lies on the southern shore of Upper Lough Erne.

Before 1450 there is no mention of this barony's name, however the land is noted as being an early Maguire stronghold, with a MacManus sept of Clan Maguire centered here.

List of main settlements
Derrylin

List of civil parishes

Below is a list of civil parishes in Knockninny:
Gallon (split with baronies of Clankelly and Coole)
Kinawley (also partly in barony of Clanawley, County Fermanagh and Tullyhaw, County Cavan)
Tomregan

See also
Ninnidh

References